Ryan Annesley Hughes (born 24 April 2001) is an English footballer who plays for  side AFC Rushden & Diamonds, where he plays as a defender.

Club career

Northampton Town
Hughes joined the youth-team at Northampton Town as a ten-year old in 2011. On 22 December 2018, he joined Southern League Premier Division Central side St Neots Town on a work experience loan deal. He made his "Saints" debut later that day, in a 2–1 defeat to Stratford Town at Rowley Park. He returned to Sixfields to make his debut for the "Cobblers" in a 3–1 defeat at Cheltenham Town on 23 March 2019. He joined AFC Rushden & Diamonds on a one-month loan on 11 October 2019. Hughes was recalled in January 2020. On 9 January 2020, Hughes joined Banbury United on a one-month loan. On 6 March 2020, he joined Corby Town on a one-month loan.

AFC Rushden & Diamonds
In August 2020, Hughes re-joined Rushden & Diamonds, this time on a permanent basis.

On 1 July 2022, Hughes, along with team mates Jesse Akubuine, Patrick Casey and Connor Furlong were named as the first four players to commit to AFC Rushden & Diamonds for the 2022–23 season.

Statistics

References

External links

2001 births
Living people
People from North Northamptonshire
English footballers
Association football defenders
Northampton Town F.C. players
St Neots Town F.C. players
Banbury United F.C. players
Corby Town F.C. players
AFC Rushden & Diamonds players
English Football League players
Southern Football League players